Ora Jean Hazlewood (August 4, 1916 – March 2, 1997) was an American screenwriter, and wife of actor Richard Widmark for 55 years. They met while they were both attending Lake Forest College.

She adapted the Alistair MacLean novel The Secret Ways for the 1961 film version.

Hazlewood married Widmark on April 5, 1942. They had a daughter, Anne Heath Widmark (born July 25, 1945), who later married baseball legend Sandy Koufax in January 1969, divorcing in 1982.

Jean Hazlewood died of Alzheimer's disease in Santa Barbara, California, at the age of 80.

References

External links
 

1916 births
1997 deaths
Deaths from dementia in California
Deaths from Alzheimer's disease
Lake Forest College alumni
American women screenwriters
20th-century American women writers
20th-century American screenwriters